The enzyme steroid-lactonase (EC 3.1.1.37) catalyzes the reaction

testololactone + H2O  testolate

This enzyme belongs to the family of hydrolases, specifically those acting on carboxylic ester bonds.  The systematic name testololactone lactonohydrolase.

References 

 

EC 3.1.1
Enzymes of unknown structure